A Man's Mate is a 1924 American silent drama film directed by Edmund Mortimer and written by Charles Kenyon. The film stars John Gilbert, Renée Adorée, Noble Johnson, Wilfrid North, Thomas R. Mills, and James Neill. The film was released on March 16, 1924, by Fox Film Corporation.

Plot
As described in a film magazine review, Paul Bonard's wealthy father is opposed to his son's choice of an artist's career. Two Apaches, the Lion and Lynx, quarrel over the Wildcat, a female member of their Paris gang. The Lynx flees, meets Paul, stuns him, and changes clothes with him. Paul is brought to the Apache den, where he conquers the Lion in a desperate fight. Paul has lost his memory and falls in love with the Wildcat. He paints a picture of her. She discovers his identity, he goes home, submits to an operation, and recovers his memory. Later he seeks out and marries the Wildcat.

Cast

References

External links
 

1924 films
1920s English-language films
Silent American drama films
1924 drama films
Fox Film films
Films directed by Edmund Mortimer
American silent feature films
American black-and-white films
1920s American films